The men's 800 metres event at the 1972 European Athletics Indoor Championships was held on 11 and 12 March in Grenoble.

Medalists

Results

Heats
First 4 from each heat (Q) qualified directly for the final.

Held on 11 March

Final
Held on 12 March

References

800 metres at the European Athletics Indoor Championships
800